Coates is a village and civil parish situated in Cotswold District, Gloucestershire, England. It is the nearest village to the source of the river Thames at Thames Head, and it is close to the course of the Foss Way or Fosse Way, the ancient Roman road. The nearest railway station is Kemble. The village population taken at the 2011 census was 507.

The parish church of St Matthew's (now part of the Thameshead Benefice) dates to the 13th century. The Grade II* listed building has a Perpendicular tower, 13th-century piscina, Norman font and a Norman doorway.

Bernard Vann, VC, spent much of his childhood in Coates rectory, where his mother was housekeeper to the Rev. T. C. Simpson, his uncle. He is commemorated in the church.

The village is home to the Coates Cricket Club that plays in the Cotswold District League. The Tunnel House Inn can be found just beyond the edge of the village towards Tarlton. The Royal Agricultural College's Rural Skills Centre is on the eastern side of the village in the buildings that were previously Coates Farm.

References

 David Verey, Gloucestershire: the Cotswolds, The Buildings of England edited by Nikolaus Pevsner, 2nd ed. (1979) , pp. 188–190

External links

Thameshead Benfice Website - for St Matthews Church
Coates Cricket Club Website
Tunnel House Inn Website
Rural Skills Centre of the Royal Agricultural College

Villages in Gloucestershire
Civil parishes in Gloucestershire